Acianthera strupifolia is a species of orchid.

strupifolia